The following is an incomplete list of monarchs of Kerma, known collectively in Middle Kingdom Egyptian texts as Hkꜣr. The Kingdom of Kerma existed as an independent state from around 2500 BCE to 1500 BCE. It was absorbed into the vigorous Egyptian Empire but would later reemerge as the Kingdom of Kush.

Rulers of Kerma
 Kaa (c. 1900 BCE)
 Teriahi (c. 1880 BCE) - son of Kaa
 Awawa (c. 1870 BCE) - son of Kaa
 [Uterer]ses (c. 1850 BCE) - son of Awawa

References

Sources

Nubian people
Lists of monarchs
Kerma
History of Nubia
Kerma culture